The Team technical routine competition of the synchronised swimming events at the 2015 World Aquatics Championships was held on 25 and 27 July 2015.

Results
The preliminary round was held on 25 July at 14:00. The final was held on 27 July at 17:30.

Green denotes finalists

References

Team technical routine